Agnes Cecilia – en sällsam historia is a 1991 Swedish mystery film directed by Anders Grönros, based on Maria Gripe's young adult novel of the same name. Grönros won the award for Best Director and Per Källberg won the award for Best Cinematography at the 27th Guldbagge Awards. It was also nominated for Best Film and Gloria Tapia was nominated for Best Actress in a leading role.

Plot
As a five-year-old, Nora loses her parents in a car accident. Her relatives never tell her the truth of what happened. Ten years later, Nora moves with her foster family into an old apartment building, where strange things begin to happen. She hears footsteps stopping outside her room, she barely escapes a fatal accident thanks to an anonymous phone call, and a book of Russian folk tales repeatedly falls open to the page reading "Go I Know Not Whither and Fetch I Know Not What". Together with her foster brother Dag, Nora searches for answers to all the questions surrounding her.

Production
Filming took place in Nyköping, Gamla Stan, and Stockholm Central Station between 9 October 1989 and May 1990.

Cast

Gloria Tapia – Eleonora "Nora" Hed
Ronn Elfors – Dag Sjöborg
Stina Ekblad – Karin Sjöborg
Allan Svensson – Anders Sjöborg
Vanna Rosenberg – Lena, Nora's friendess
Cecilia Milocco – Agnes Cecilia Eng / Tetti
Mimi Pollak – Hulda Persson, Inga's mother
Meta Velander – Vera Alm, Nora's mat. grandmother
Percy Brandt – Birger Alm, Nora's mat. grandfather
Natasha Chiapponi-Grönros – Nora as a child
Benjamin Elfors – Dag as a child
Bojan Westin – Inga, Lena's mat. grandmother
Suzanne Reuter – Carita Eng, Tetti's mother
Beatrice Chiapponi-Grönros – Anna Hed, Nora's mother
Björn Andrésen – Per Hed, Nora's father
Olle Johansson – Clockmaker
Måns Westfelt – Doll-doctor
Fredrik Grundel – Teacher
Anne Otto – Nurse
Clemens Paal – Construction-worker

References

External links
 
 

1991 films
1990s mystery films
1990s Swedish-language films
Films whose director won the Best Director Guldbagge Award
Swedish mystery films
1990s Swedish films